Hurry Up and Wait is the debut album from the punk rock band Riddlin' Kids. It was released August 6, 2002 under the record label Sony. The album features the song "I Feel Fine", "Pick Up the Pieces", featured in ATV Offroad Fury 2.

Track listing 
Crazy
Here We Go Again
See The Light
Blind
I Feel Fine
Nowhere to Run
Follow Through
Take
Tina
OK
Pick Up the Pieces
Faithful
Can't Think
Wasted Away
It's the End of the World as We Know It

NOTE: The track "Believe" is a hidden track that can be heard after "It's the End of the World as We Know It" by fast forwarding 3:40 into the track.

2002 albums
Riddlin' Kids albums
Columbia Records albums